State Road 298 (SR 298), known locally as Lillian Highway, is a mostly east–west thoroughfare in Pensacola, Florida. It runs from its intersection with U.S. Highway 98 (US 98 or SR 30) and Dog Track Road, skirting Perdido Bay on its way east to its terminus at the West Pensacola spur of SR 295. SR 298 passes under the mainline of SR 295 without an interchange. It serves as a major route through the communities of Myrtle Grove and West Pensacola.

Major intersections

Related route

County Road 298A (CR 298A, also known as West Jackson Street) is a county road in Escambia County. From the mid 1950s through the late 1970s/early 1980s, it was part of State Road 298A. It is an alternate route to SR 298 running between SR 727 (N Fairfield Drive), two blocks south of SR 298, and US 98/SR 292. The entire road is only two lanes wide.

While the road was part of the state highway system, it extended north along Fairfield Drive to return to SR 298. By 1981, the road had been removed from the state highway system and became part of CR 298A. Through the late 2010s, CR 298A was extended further east to end at US 29/SR 95 (N Palafox Street) in downtown Pensacola.

References

External links

298
298